Aspergillus hiratsukae is a species of fungus in the genus Aspergillus. It is from the Fumigati section. The species was first described in 1991. It has been reported to produce avenaciolide.

Growth and morphology

A. hiratsukae has been cultivated on both Czapek yeast extract agar (CYA) plates and Malt Extract Agar Oxoid® (MEAOX) plates. The growth morphology of the colonies can be seen in the pictures below.

References 

hiratsukae
Fungi described in 1991